Terence Bay (Canada 2021 Census population 678) is a rural fishing community on the Chebucto Peninsula in the Halifax Regional Municipality, Nova Scotia. It is located on the shore of the Atlantic Ocean, 10 km off the Prospect Road, off Route 333, 21.2 kilometers from Halifax.

The community has the status of designated place in Canadian census data. Its name may also sometimes be seen as Terrence Bay, although Terence is the correct spelling.

History and local geography

The area, which is located at the tip of the Chebucto Peninsula, was originally settled in the early 1880s or possibly before, probably by Irish fishermen. Early records for the area include the 1827 Census of Halifax and the parish register of Our Lady of Mount Carmel (Roman Catholic), Prospect, whose entries begin in 1823 and include Terence Bay families.  By the 1850s, the population of Terence Bay consisted mainly of the descendants of Irish and German immigrants to NS, many of whose descendants still reside there.

The origin of the name "Terence" in reference to the community is uncertain; theories have included that it is a mispronunciation or misspelling of "Terns", or of "Turner", although "Turner" is unknown in the community as a historical surname. What is certain is that the 1865 A. F. Church Map of Halifax County names it "Turns Bay".

The area in which Terence Bay is situated also contains the communities of Lower Prospect at which the  disaster occurred, and Sandy Cove, at which a cemetery and monument to the wreck and an interpretive centre are located.

Demographics 

Communications
 Area code 902; Telephone exchanges  - 852, 850
 Forward sortation area - B3T

Schools
Terence Bay School
Atlantic Memorial School, Terence Bay site

Demographics
Source: 2016 Canada census
Total Population: 749
Total Dwellings: 371
Total Land Area: 3.37

The area had a population density of approximately 222/km2, which is approximately 3 times more dense than the municipal average of 73.4/km2.

References

Photo Fisheries and Oceans Canada

External links
Lighthouse Route  Destination Nova Scotia
Explore HRM

Communities in Halifax, Nova Scotia
Designated places in Nova Scotia
General Service Areas in Nova Scotia